The FAdeA IA-100 Malvina is an Argentine trainer aircraft developed by the Fábrica Argentina de Aviones from December 2014. It was first flown in 2016.

Design and development
The IA-100 was developed as a result of a project to demonstrate FAdeA's current design and production capabilities, as a basis for a future indigenous training aircraft. The outcome was a technology demonstrator that incorporated processes and materials common in many industries but still new to FAdeA, such as composite materials.

In August 2020, the Argentinian Ministry of Defence named the aircraft "Malvina", after Argentina's name for the Falkland Islands.

Specifications

References

Further reading

External links

 FAdeA IA-100 page

2010s Argentine military trainer aircraft
Aircraft first flown in 2016
FMA aircraft